Adrian Justine Aquino Muhlach or AJ Muhlach (born May 20, 1992), is a Filipino pop singer, actor, and a member of the boy band XLR8. He starred in the Philippine television drama P.S. I Love You in 2011, and Bagets on TV5.

Muhlach was part of the P-pop group XLR8 which used to perform on Party Pilipinas in GMA Network. He's currently part of Viva Artists Agency.

Personal life
Muhlach is the younger brother of actor Aga Muhlach, and the cousin of Niño Muhlach, also an actor. His father has Spanish-German ancestry. He is a member of the Iglesia ni Cristo.

Filmography

Television

Films

References

External links
 

1992 births
AJ
Living people
Filipino pop singers
Filipino male film actors
Filipino people of Spanish descent
Filipino people of German descent
Members of Iglesia ni Cristo
GMA Network personalities
TV5 (Philippine TV network) personalities
ABS-CBN personalities
Star Magic
Viva Artists Agency
21st-century Filipino singers
Filipino male television actors
People from Quezon City